The 31st Pennsylvania House of Representatives District is in southeastern Pennsylvania and has been represented by Perry Warren since 2017.

District profile 
The 31st Pennsylvania House of Representatives District is located in Bucks County
and includes the following areas:

 Lower Makefield Township
 Newtown
 Newtown Township
Upper Makefield Township
 Yardley

Representatives

Recent election results

References

External links 

 District map from the United States Census Bureau
 Pennsylvania House Legislative District Maps from the Pennsylvania Redistricting Commission.
 Population Data for District 31 from the Pennsylvania Redistricting Commission.

Government of Bucks County, Pennsylvania
31